Samuel Odeyobo (born 28 September 1993) is a Nigerian professional footballer who plays for Lithuanian club FC Hegelmann.

Career
Odeyobo came to Belarus in 2013. He was on a trial in Belarusian First League club Smolevichi-STI but couldn't sign a contract due to issues with the documents. He spent a few years playing at the amateur level before being recruited by Krumkachy Minsk in 2016.

FC Hegelmann 
In February 2022 he signed with Lithuanian FC Hegelmann.

References

External links 
 
 

1993 births
Living people
Nigerian footballers
Association football midfielders
FC Krumkachy Minsk players
FC Naftan Novopolotsk players
FC Granit Mikashevichi players
FC Belshina Bobruisk players
FC Torpedo-BelAZ Zhodino players
FC Hegelmann players
Nigerian expatriate footballers
Expatriate footballers in Belarus
Expatriate footballers in Lithuania
Nigerian expatriate sportspeople in Belarus
Nigerian expatriate sportspeople in Lithuania